Edwin Patrick "Ted" McDonald (29 September 1875 – 17 March 1919) was an Australian rules footballer who played with Essendon in the Victorian Football League (VFL).

Family

Parents
He was born on 29 September 1875 in Nagambie, Victoria. He was the son of Patrick McDonald (1852–1928) and Margaret McDonald (1853–1928), née Figgins.

Siblings
He was one of five boys and three girls. Two of his brothers also played VFL football: Arch McDonald with Essendon, and Fen McDonald with both Carlton and Melbourne.

Fen enlisted in the First Australian Imperial Force (AIF), and was killed in action during the landing at Anzac Cove, Gallipoli, in Turkey on 25 April 1915. Another brother, Stanley David McDonald (1888–1945), also served in the First AIF, enlisting on 20 May 1915, before the news of Fen's death had reached his family.

Wife
He married Mary Ann Vaughan (1872–1940) in 1898.

Football
Ted and his younger brother, Arch, played together in their only game with the Essendon First XVIII: the last match of the season, against Fitzroy, at the East Melbourne Cricket Ground, on 9 September 1905.

The Nagambie Hotel
From 1904, until his death in 1919, he was the owner and licensee of The Nagambie Hotel.

Death
He died at Nagambie on 17 March 1919.

See also
 List of Australian rules football families

Notes

References 
 Maplestone, M., Flying Higher: History of the Essendon Football Club 1872–1996, Essendon Football Club, (Melbourne), 1996.

External links 

1875 births
1919 deaths
Australian rules footballers from Victoria (Australia)
Essendon Football Club players